The 2009 Laurence Olivier Awards were held in 2009 in London celebrating excellence in West End theatre by the Society of London Theatre.

Winners and nominees
Details of winners (in bold) and nominees, in each award category, per the Society of London Theatre.

Productions with multiple nominations and awards
The following 24 productions, including two ballets and four operas, received multiple nominations:

 7: La Cage aux Folles
 5: Black Watch, Jersey Boys, Piaf and Zorro
 4: August: Osage County, Brief Encounter, Sunset Boulevard, The Chalk Garden, The Histories and The Norman Conquests
 3: Marguerite, No Man's Land and Partenope
 2: Don Carlo, Hamlet, I pagliacci, Impressing the Czar, Infra, Ivanov, That Face, The Minotaur, Twelfth Night and West Side Story

The following four productions received multiple awards:

 4: Black Watch
 3: The Histories
 2: La Cage aux Folles and The Chalk Garden

See also
 63rd Tony Awards

References

External links
 Previous Olivier Winners – 2009

Laurence Olivier Awards ceremonies
Laurence Olivier
Laur
Laurence Olivier Awards
Laurence Olivier Awards